Force Five is an American adaptation of five different anime television series. In the United States, this series was primarily shown only in New England, Pennsylvania, and Virginia, though it did make brief appearances in other markets, such as Texas and Northern California on KICU-TV 36. It was also shown in Toronto, Ontario, Canada on CFMT channel 47 and in Asia on Star Plus during the 1990s. It was produced by Jim Terry and his company American Way, and it consisted of five imported Japanese giant robot serials (originally produced in the mid-1970s by Toei Animation) in response to the popularity of the Shogun Warriors toy collection. Mattel was one of the sponsors of the series.

In an anthology style, the five shows were broadcast simultaneously with one episode of each serial assigned a specific weekday. Additionally, all of the shows were edited into two-hour movies and marketed on video tape by Family Home Entertainment. In the UK, Krypton Force released several of these programmes but under different series titles.

Force Five series
Force Five consisted of the following five series:

Originally, Great Mazinger was meant to be among the five shows, but at the last minute was swapped out for Starzinger.

External links
 Absolute Anime profile Force Five Television show

1980 American television series debuts
1985 American television series endings
1980s American animated television series
1980s American anthology television series
American children's animated anthology television series
English-language television shows
First-run syndicated television programs in the United States
Mecha anime and manga
American television series based on Japanese television series